Musa Karli (born January 27, 1990) is a German footballer who most recently played for Atlas Delmenhorst. At international level, he has represented the Arameans Suryoye football team. He previously played in the 3. Liga for Darmstadt 98.

External links
 
 

Living people
1990 births
People from Delmenhorst
German people of Assyrian/Syriac descent
German footballers
Footballers from Lower Saxony
Association football midfielders
3. Liga players
Atlas Delmenhorst players
SV Wilhelmshaven players
SV Darmstadt 98 players
VfB Oldenburg players